Gullu Yologlu - Chairperson of the World Turkology Center, PhD, Doctor of Historical Sciences has contributed ethnology, folklore studies, literature, history, religious studies and other scientific fields in Azerbaijan by providing information, analysis and outcomes with her scholarly and scholarly-publicistic articles and books, and her scientific and artistic radio and television programs since 1990's. Her main research areas are faiths, traditions, ethnic identities, shamanist past, material and non-material culture of small-numbered Turkic peoples living in countries from the Siberia to the Balkans.

Early life 
Gullu Yologlu Mammadli was born into a family of teachers, in Mesha-oba (Mesha Shambul) village (which is in Balakan district at present) in Zagatala district of Azerbaijan on May 5, 1963, although her origins come from Janalli village of Gazakh district. Her father Yologlu Kamil Gulmammadov, a history-literature teacher and her mother Nahida Mahmud Bayramova, a physics-math teacher, worked in Zagatala.

Yologlu moved to Janalli, to her father’s homeland with her parents when she was 3.

Education 
Finishing school named after Samad Vurgun in Gazakh in 1980, Yologlu enrolled in the Institute of the Russian Language and Literature named after Mirza Fatali Akhundov (at present Baku Slavic University) in the same year and graduated in 1985. She interned at Astrakhan Pedagogical State University (Russia) during 1983-1984.

Academia 
Gullu Yologlu would constantly visit Moldova and conduct research on the Romanians and Gagauz people starting from her undergraduate years. She described Azerbaijani-Gagauz literary ties in the second chapter of her graduation paper on Azerbaijan-Moldova literary relations. The second chapter of Yologlu’s thesis which she defended in 1992 titled “Azerbaijan-Moldova literary relations” in which she had developed her research on the Gagauz people.

She is the author of 6 books and 123 printed scholarly publications.

She defended her doctoral dissertation titled “Ceremonies of Turkic Peoples (historical-ethnographic study on the basis of Tuva, Khakas and Gagauz Turks’ materials)”  in 2006.

She is a member of Scientific Council of the Ahi Evran University (Kirshehir, Turkey).

Gullu Yologlu has been member of the Journalists’ Union of Azerbaijan since 1992 and Writer’s Union of Azerbaijan since 1996. In 1998, she was elected as an associate member of the Atatürk Cultural Center in Ankara, Turkey. Suleyman Demirel, the then President of Turkey, presented a diploma to Yologlu in the conference hall of TIKA (Turkish Cooperation and Coordination Agency).

She is a lead researcher at the Institute of Archeology and Ethnography at the Azerbaijan National Academy of Sciences (ANAS) and member of the Dissertation Council.

Television and radio programs 
Gullu Yologlu has presented and authored several radio and television programs. She has been author and presenter of "Soyumuz, soykökümüz" ("Our ancestry and roots") and “Dədə Qorqud-1300” ("Dada Gorgud-1300") rubrics at musical informational program "Sahar" ("Morning"), also "Min illərin işığı" ("The Light of Millennia") and editor of “Qopuz” (“Gopuz”) TV programs and "Böyük çöl" ("Great Steppe"), "Soyumuz, soykökümüz" ("Our ancestry and roots"), "Yurd yeri" ("Motherland") radio programs at the Azerbaijan Television and Radio Broadcasting Closed Joint-Stock Company. At present, she is the scriptwriter of "Əsrlərdən gələn səslar" ("The Sounds of Ages") and "Türk elləri" ("Turkic Lands") and also presenter of "Keçmişdən gələcəyə" ("From the Past to the Future") programs.

Activities
Gullu Yologlu is the Chairperson of the World Turkology Center founded on October 3, 2019 in Baku.

Books 
1. The Gagauz People (Qaqauzlar). – Baku, “Azarnashr”, 1996 48 p.

It provides detailed information about history, traditions, language, faith and literature of the Gagauz people living in Moldova. The book played an important role in helping Azerbaijani readers to know more about Orthodox Christian Gagauz people aftermath of the dissolution of the USSR.

2. Gagauz Folklore (Qaqouz folkloru). - Baku, “Yazichi”, 1996, 200 p.

In her book “Gagauz Folklore”, Gullu Yologlu has included Gagauz people's folklore materials which she had collected during her visits to Moldova and translated into Azerbaijani with a large introduction. Presented materials describe the Gagauz people’s deportation to southern areas of Moldova from the Balkans during Russian-Ottoman wars and anti-Turkish policies and efforts to separate the people from its roots.

3. Dada Gorgud’s Age (Dədə Qorqud yaşı). - Baku, “Yeni Nashrlar evi”, 1999, 136 p.

Scholar's collected articles describe creation and versions of “The Book of Dada Gorgud”, highlight various issues, such as "folklore" that was produced under the Soviet directions, shamans' activities in Siberia and other countries under the shield of Islam and Christianity, also Russification and Christianization policies of the Russian Empire in Siberia, mother's role in mixed marriages, etc.

4. Family Rituals of the Turks (based on the ethnographic materials of the Tuva, Khakas and Gagauz Turks) (Türklerin aile merasimleri (tıva, xakas, qaqauz türklərinin etnoqrafik materialları əsasında)). – Ankara (Turkey), 1999, 180 p.

Family-life ceremonies of predominantly Muslim Azerbaijani Turks, Christian Gagauz and Khakas Turks and Lamaist (Tibetan Buddhist) Tuva Turks are studied in comparison, and common features in deeper layers are researched by delicately putting the religions aside that were adopted willingly or forcefully. The book reveals that roots of a lot of traditions and ceremonies of Turkic peoples that were thought to be derived from Islam, Christianity and Tibetan Buddhism were actually the same and related to shamanism and they continue their existence under current religious beliefs.

5. The First Letter (translations from Romanian literature) ("İlk məktub" (Rumıniya ədəbiyyatından tərcümələr)). – Baku, “Adiloghlu”, 2002, 258 p.

The book presents translated stories and narratives mostly on political topics written by members of ethnic groups in Romania, including the Moldovan-Romanians which were torn apart by the decision of the central Soviet government, and Tatars settled down in Dobruja fleeing persecutions from Tsarist Russia, with a large introduction. Some of the stories describe methods of torture used under the Soviet regime against Romanians.

6. Seasonal Ceremonies (on the basis of materials of the Turkic peoples) ("Mövsüm mərasimləri" (türk xalqlarının materialları əsasında)). – Baku, “Khazar University”, 2009, 218 p.

The monograph studies influences of climate, geographical features, neighbors and historical roots on Turkic peoples' ceremonies and way of life. Most of the materials were collected during Gullu Yologlu's visits to Russia (Southern Siberia, Ural-Idel region, North Caucasus), Central Asia, Turkey, Iran, Iraq and other countries.

Awards 
In 1998, shortly after her speech at the 10th Assembly of Azerbaijani Writers Yologlu was awarded with an individual scholarship by Heydar Aliyev, the then President of the Republic of Azerbaijan.
She was declared “The Most Diligent Scholar of the Year” by “Simourg” International Award Foundation in 2001. 
She was awarded with “Award of Service of 2002” by KIBATEK (Cyprus, the Balkans, Institute of Eurasian Studies) in 2003.

Video 
Türk Bilgələr Zirvəsi/Güllü Yoloğlu 

Böyük Türk Qurultayı - Macarıstan 

Uluslararası Somuncu Baba ve Kültür Çevresi Sempozyumu Birinci Oturum 

Kosmopolitizm və milli dəyərlər

Personal life 
She is married and has two daughters.

References

External links
 Gagauz Folklore (Qaqouz folkloru)

Azerbaijani scholars
Azerbaijani women journalists
Turkologists
Ethnologists
Women television journalists
Women radio journalists
Azerbaijani writers
1963 births
Living people
Azerbaijani women anthropologists
Azerbaijani anthropologists
20th-century anthropologists
21st-century anthropologists